Waszulki-Kolonia  is a settlement in the administrative district of Gmina Nidzica, within Nidzica County, Warmian-Masurian Voivodeship, in northern Poland.

References

Waszulki-Kolonia